Joseph Stanton Jr. (1739–1821) was a U.S. Senator from Rhode Island from 1790 to 1793. Senator Stanton may also refer to:

Benjamin Stanton (1809–1872), Ohio State Senate
Henry Brewster Stanton (1805–1887), New York State Senate
William Henry Stanton (congressman) (1843–1900), Pennsylvania State Senate
Zed S. Stanton (1848–1921), Vermont State Senate